Clinton Louis Cutler (December 27, 1929 – April 9, 1994) was a general authority of the Church of Jesus Christ of Latter-day Saints (LDS Church) from 1990 until his death. He was a member of the Second Quorum of the Seventy and was a counselor in the church's Sunday School General Presidency.

Cutler was born in Salt Lake City, Utah, and received his college education at Utah State University and the University of Utah. He then worked for many years for the company that became US West Communications. He was an assistant vice president when he retired in 1986.

Prior to becoming a general authority, Cutler served in the LDS Church as president of the Washington Seattle Mission, regional representative, president of the Littleton Colorado Stake (beginning at its creation in 1973, president of the Boise Idaho West Stake, and bishop. Cutler was second counselor in the Sunday School General Presidency from October 1991 to August 1992 and was first counselor from August 1992 until his death.

Notes

References
"Elder Clinton L. Cutler Succumbs to Cancer", Deseret News, April 10, 1994.
"Elder Clinton L. Cutler Of the Seventy", Ensign, May 1990.
"Elder Clinton L. Cutler of the Seventy Eulogized", Ensign, May 1994
"Clinton L. Cutler", Grandpa Bill's GA pages

1929 births
American leaders of the Church of Jesus Christ of Latter-day Saints
Members of the Second Quorum of the Seventy (LDS Church)
Utah State University alumni
University of Utah alumni
1994 deaths
American Mormon missionaries in the United States
Latter Day Saints from Colorado
Latter Day Saints from Idaho
Latter Day Saints from Utah
Mission presidents (LDS Church)
Regional representatives of the Twelve
Counselors in the General Presidency of the Sunday School (LDS Church)
People from Salt Lake City
Deaths from cancer in Utah
Religious leaders from Colorado
Religious leaders from Idaho